Max Pomeranc (born March 21, 1984) is an American former child actor.

Pomeranc was born in New York City, New York. His mother, Marion Hess Pomeranc, is an author, and his father, Abe Pomeranc, is a stock broker. He made his acting debut at the age of eight, playing the lead in the film Searching for Bobby Fischer, based on the childhood of International Master Josh Waitzkin. At the time Pomeranc appeared in the film, he was also one of the USA's top 20 chess players in his age group. Pomeranc next starred in the 1995 family movie Fluke starring Matthew Modine, Nancy Travis and Eric Stoltz.

Filmography 
 Searching for Bobby Fischer (1993)
 Nowhere to Hide (1994) (TV)
 Fluke (1995)
 Journey (1995) (TV)
 Definitely, Maybe (2008)

Awards

References

External links
 

American male film actors
American male child actors
Male actors from New York City
Jewish American male actors
Living people
1984 births
21st-century American Jews